A department store is a retail establishment offering a wide range of consumer goods.

Department Store may also refer to:
 Department Store (1935 film), a British crime film
 Department Store (1939 film), an Italian comedy film
 The Department Store, a 1920 British silent comedy film
 Department Store Historic District, Hartford, Connecticut, United States